Lomas (Spanish for "hills"), also called fog oases and  mist oases, are areas of fog-watered vegetation in the coastal desert of Peru and northern Chile. Apart from river valleys and the lomas the coastal desert is almost without vegetation. Scholars have described individual lomas as "an island of vegetation in a virtual ocean of desert."

In a nearly rainless desert, the lomas owe their existence to the moist dense fog and mist which rolls in from the Pacific.  The fog is called garúa in Peru and Camanchaca in Chile.

Environment
 
According to the Köppen Climate Classification system, the coastal desert of Peru and the Atacama desert of Chile feature a rare desert climate, that is abbreviated "BWn" on climate maps with the n denoting frequent fog. Many years have no precipitation at all. The Atacama Desert of Chile is commonly known as the driest non-polar place in the world. 
Arica, Chile, in the middle portion of the coastal desert, went a record 173 months without measurable precipitation in the early 20th century.

Occasional rainfall is caused by El Niño. In a phenomenon called the flowering desert, after the rare rains the desert briefly blooms with flowers. Normally, with the nearly non-existent precipitation, the coastal desert is almost devoid of vegetation except in lomas and along rivers which originate in the Andes and cross the desert to the Pacific. 

The moisture for the vegetation in the lomas comes from fog which rolls in from the nearby Pacific Ocean and embraces mountains which come down near the sea. The cold waters of the Humboldt Current run offshore. During the austral winter thick stratus clouds, the garúa, creep inland to an altitude of  most days from May until November. During this season the vegetation in the lomas is lush and green and many species of flowers bloom. In the austral summer from December to April, the weather is mostly sunny and the lomas become dryer. The moisturizing impact of the fog is increased by the mild temperatures throughout the year and high average humidity of the coastal deserts. Lima's average humidity is 84 percent, more than double the average humidity in most deserts.

Lomas comprise less than two percent of the coastal desert areas of Chile and Peru.

Climate change
Teetering on a narrow edge of survival, the lomas are sensitive to climate change.  Radio-carbon dating has indicated that, prior to 3800 BCE, the Peruvian desert north of Lima (12° S latitude) received more seasonal precipitation and was mostly vegetated. Lomas—isolated fog oases—existed only south of Lima.  This is evidenced by the uniformity of plant species in present-day lomas north of Lima while lomas south of Lima have more endemic plant species, indicating geographic isolation. The cause of the climatic change was probably the duration and strength of El Niño events.

Destruction

Lomas have been impacted, and in some cases destroyed, by centuries of unregulated grazing, wood-cutting, and mining.  In Chile, the Huasco (28°26′ S) and Copiapó (27°22′ S) river valleys once supported dense stands of trees.  In the 18th century, the city of Copiapó was known as San Francisco de la Selva (Saint Francis of the Forest) for its extensive forests.
As the branches of trees and bushes trap the fog and create more moisture for other plants, their absence reduces the viability for all the plant life in the lomas.

In many locations the lomas were over-exploited for agriculture and grazing. Hundreds of people of the Chiribaya culture benefited from this unlikely agriculture in a rainless land. Later, during the 17th century, Spanish colonists pastured 200 mules in these lomas. As late as 1951, a few tara trees still lived although the lomas were by then nearly devoid of all vegetation and population.

Preservation

The National University of Saint Augustine in Arequipa has partnered with Peruvian conservation groups and the Nature Conservancy to preserve and restore the environment of the lomas. Included in the project is the installation of fog-catching nets to capture water, thereby helping the 80 families who live within the area to expand agriculture, primarily of olives. Similar methods have been used for the conservation of lomas in Lima.

In Chile the Pan de Azúcar (26°09′S) and Llanos de Challe (28°10′) National Parks and the La Chimba National Reserve (23°32′S, 70°21′W) preserve lomas. The richest diversity of species of lomas flora in Chile, however, is near the village of Paposo (25°00′S). The Paposo area has been declared a Zone of Ecological Protection by the Government of Chile.

References

Deserts of Chile
Deserts of Peru
Oases of Chile
Atacama Desert
Ecoregions of Chile
Ecoregions of Peru
Deserts and xeric shrublands
Fog